Pesnya goda, meaning Song of the Year, is an annual Russian music gala and former Soviet televised music festival. First held in 1971, it became the main event of the year for Soviet singers and musical groups. Pesnya goda is traditionally recorded in December and aired on television in early January, as part of the New Year's festivities. Up to 2004 Channel One Russia was the official TV broadcaster of the national finals (former Programme One of Soviet Central Television with a break in 1992), today Russia 1 serves as the official TV partner since 2006.

History
In many ways, the history of "Pesnya goda" mirrored the history of the former Soviet Union. The songs selected for the initial festivals were strictly censored and required to be consistent with the social norms established by the Communist Party. The performers were all conservatory graduates in good standing with pristine reputations and conservative looks, the same case fell also for the VIAs whose songs were also featured. Over time as Soviet society became more liberal and in the 1980s during the era of perestroika, the festival began to include a broader range of musical styles, song lyrics, and performers. From 1971 and 1972 it had been aired in black and white and via videotape, starting 1973 the program has been prerecorded in color (and today taped in digital video and high definition).

In the 1990s, after the collapse of the Soviet Union, the "Pesnya goda" festival was reborn in 1993 and became part of the new society's New Year's tradition, providing an escape from the harsh socioeconomic realities of life in Russia in the 1990s. In the 2000s, the festival became a television extravaganza featuring the most commercially successful and popular artists of Russian pop and rock music.

All performers included in the televised final of the festival are considered "winners" and referred to as such in the media. The two performers that have received the most inclusions in Pesnya goda are Lev Leshchenko who was in 48 festival (each year from 1971 to 2022, except for 1989, 2005, and 2007), Sofia Rotaru, who was in 46 festival each year from 1973 to 2021, except for 2002, and  Other artists that have been perennial Pesnya goda winners include Iosif Kobzon (41 times)), Valentina Tolkunova, Edita Piekha, Laima Vaikule, Igor Nikolayev, Irina Allegrova and Alla Pugacheva.

The best known hosts of the festival are Angelina Vovk and Evgueny Menishov, who hosted it from 1988 until 2006, Anna Shilova and Igor Kirillov, who hosted it from 1971 until 1975, and Svetlana Zhiltsova and Alexander Maslyakov, who hosted it from 1976 until 1979. The most recent hosts are Lera Kudryavtseva and Sergey Lazarev, who have been hosting it since 2007.

2019 marked an historic first for the event as the rap performance of Russian pop-singer Egor Kreed (with popular singer Philip Kirkorov) made the first rap song to be featured in the festival.

2021 marked the 50th year since the festival was created, marking a historic golden jubilee year for the event.

Records and statistics

Appearances in finals

See also

List of historic rock festivals

References

Further reading
 Red stars : Personality and the Soviet Popular Song, 1955-1991 author: David MacFadyen, editor: Montreal : McGill-Queen's University Press, ©2001.

External links

 http://pesnyagoda.my1.ru/main.html
 http://www.pesnya-goda.ru
 http://www.nydailynews.com/archives/entertainment/1997/05/25/1997-05-25_bring_in__da__music__radio_c.html
 Pesnya goda 1985
 Pesnya goda 1990
 Pesnya goda 2000
 Pesnya goda 2003 parte 1  Pesnya goda 2003 parte 2 and 3  
 Pesnya goda 2004
 Pesnya goda 2014  

Singing talent shows
Channel One Russia original programming
Russia-1 original programming
Song contests
Soviet culture
Competitions in the Soviet Union
Music festivals in Russia
Russian music awards
1970s Soviet television series
1980s Soviet television series
1990s Russian television series
2000s Russian television series
Russian music television series
Music festivals established in 1971
Pop music festivals
Rock festivals in Russia